Evil Spirit is a 1928 Soviet drama film, directed by Patvakan Barkhudaryan and Mikheil Gelovani and starring Hasmik, Nina Manucharyan and Mikheil Gelovani

Cast 
Hasmik as Shushan
Nina Manucharyan as Zarnishan
Mikheil Gelovani as Crazy Danel
B. Madatova as Sona
Hambartsum Khachanyan as Servant
M. Garagash as Merchant
Samvel Mkrtchyan as Murad
A. Mamikonyan as Voskan
A. Papyan as Javahir
A. Abrahamyan
S. Epitashvili

References

External links
 

Films directed by Patvakan Barkhudaryan
Films directed by Mikheil Gelovani
Armenian black-and-white films
Soviet black-and-white films
Films set in Armenia
Soviet-era Armenian films
Armenfilm films
Soviet silent feature films
Soviet drama films
1928 drama films
1928 films
1929 drama films
1929 films
Armenian silent feature films
Armenian drama films
Silent drama films